Rochelle Potkar is an Indian fiction writer and poet based in Mumbai, India. Her work includes the short story collections The Arithmetic of Breasts and Other Stories and Bombay Hangovers, and the poetry collections Four Degrees of Separation and Paper Asylum.

She was a writer-in-residence in the 2015 Fall residency at the University of Iowa's International Writing Program, and the Charles Wallace Writer's fellow at the University of Stirling, Scotland in 2016-17. She is the founder of the Arcs-of-a-Circle artists' residency program.

Early life and education 
Rochelle Potkar was born in Kalyan to Goan parents. She moved to Mumbai in 1998. She completed a college degree in commerce and a post-graduate degree in advertising from Wigan and Leigh College, Mahalaxmi. She completed an MBA from La Trobe University, Australia.

Career

As writer 
Her short stories and poems have been published in books, journals, and anthologies. She wrote her first short story, "Matamorphosis of Joe Pereira" after she moved from Kaylan to Mumbai, and also wrote poetry about her transition to the city during that time. After visiting the Tapi estuary at Surat in 2007 and then attending her first fiction-writing workshop, she wrote the story "Tropical Estuary." 

In 2013, she participated in a Tall Tales project storytelling event, and shared a story from her personal experience. Her first book of short fiction, The Arithmetic of Breasts and Other Stories, was published in 2014 and shortlisted for The Digital Book of the Year Award 2014, by Publishing Next, Goa. In 2014, she was one of the founders of Cappuccino Readings (CR), which organized a series of poetry readings at a Starbucks in Horniman Circle in Mumbai. Around this time, she also participated in Poetry Couture, an association formed by Raghavendra Madhu to promote poetry readings in India, and was co-editor of Neesah Magazine.

In 2015, she was selected to participate as a writer-in-residence in the 2015 Fall residency program of the International Writing Program at the University of Iowa. In a January 2016 interview, she discussed elements of realism and magic realism in her work, and said her writing is influenced by Haruki Murakami. 

Her first book of poetry, Four Degrees of Separation, was published in 2016, and includes poetry written during her transition to Mumbai. In 2016, two of her poems, "Biscooti Love" and "Knotted Inside Me", were included in the anthology 40 under 40: an Anthology of Post-Globalization Poetry. 

She was the 2016-2017 Charles Wallace Writer's fellow at the University of Stirling, Scotland. In 2017, she founded the Arcs-of-a-Circle Artists' Residency in Mumbai, and organized its first ten-day event for 12 artists in December 2017 with funding support from the US Consulate, Mumbai. In 2017 and 2018, she contributed to the Joao Roque Literary Journal as the poetry editor.

Rochelle practices and promotes the Japanese short poetry form haibun through workshops. In 2018, she published a collection of haibun, Paper Asylum.

In 2018, a poem she wrote during her Iowa residency, Skirt, was adapted into a poetry film by Philippa Collie Cousins for the Visible Poetry Project. 
 
She co-edited the 2018 Goan-Irish anthology, Goa: A Garland of Poems, with Gabriel Rosenstock. Her collection of short stories, Bombay Hangovers, was published in 2021. Her short story "Honour" was included in The Punch Magazine’s Anthology of New Writing: Select Short Stories by Women Writers, also published in 2021.

As actor 
Rochelle debuted in a character role in the Tamil feature-length film, Taramani, directed by Ram.

Selected work

Poetry 
 Four Degrees of Separation, Paperwall, March 2016 
 Paper Asylum, Copper Coin Publishing, May 2018

Short stories 
 The Arithmetic of Breasts And Other Stories, CreateSpace, 2014, Rochelle Potkar, 2019 

 Bombay Hangovers, Vishwakarma Publications

Novel
Dreams of Déjà vu (2017)

Anthologies 
 40 Under 40: An Anthology of Post-Globalisation, Poetrywalla, 2016 
 The Best Asian Short Stories, Kitab International, 2017 
 Goa: A Garland of Poems, The Onslaught Press, 2017 
 Iowa River: A Selection of Contemporary International Poetry 
 100 Poems Are Not Enough, Walking BookFairs, 2018 
 Writing Language, Culture, and Development: Africa Vs Asia: Volume 1, 2018 
 The Punch Magazine Anthology of New Writing: Select Short Stories by Women Writers, Niyogi Books, 2021

Honors and awards

Short fiction
 Shortlist, Digital Book of the Year Award, 2014, by Publishing Next, Goa, for The Arithmetic of Breasts And Other Stories
 Winner, Open Road Review Short Story Prize, 2016, for "The Leaves of the Deodar"

Poetry
 Shortlist, RL Poetry Award 2013, for "Knotted inside me"
 Second place, Wordweavers contest 2014 for "Swing"
 Shortlist, the Gregory O' Donoghue International Poetry Prize, 2018, for The girl from Lal Bazaar 
 Shortlist, 2017 Hungry Hill Writing Competition, Ireland, for "Cellular: P.O.W." 
 Third place at the David Burland Poetry Prize 2017, for "Ground up" 
 Shortlist, Eyewar 8th Fortnight Poetry Prize by Todd Swift, for "Atonement"
 Winner of the 2018 Norton Girault Literary Prize for "To Daraza"
 First runner up, Great India Poetry Contest, for "War Specials"

See also 

 List of female poets
 List of Indian poets
 Indian poetry in English
 Goan literature

References

External links
Official website
 Writing is addiction, catharsis,  therapy (Interview at The Goan)

Living people
1979 births
Poets from Maharashtra
Women writers from Maharashtra
Writers from Mumbai
English-language poets from India
La Trobe University alumni
International Writing Program alumni
21st-century Indian poets
21st-century Indian women writers
Indian feminist writers
Indian women poets